Germaine Monteil was a New York-based French fashion designer and cosmetician who founded the cosmetics and perfume company sharing her name.

Fashion
Born in France in 1898, Monteil moved to the United States in the early 1930s. A high-end dressmaker as well as a cosmetician, she first established herself as a fashion designer. She made classic dresses with flaring circular or pleated skirts and slim silhouettes, and was renowned for her use of prints which appealed to the American market. In 1938, Monteil won a Neiman Marcus Fashion Award in recognition of her influence upon the fashion industry. This was the first year in which the awards were presented. She died in 1987.

Cosmetics & perfumes
In 1936, Monteil founded with her husband, Guy Bjorkman, Germaine Monteil Cosmetiques Corp. as a sideline to her fashion business, offering skin treatments and creams. Her first perfume, Laughter (later renamed Rigolade), came out in 1941. The increasing success of this sideline led to Monteil abandoning fashion design in the late 1940s to focus on perfume and cosmetics. The company was acquired by cosmetics giant Revlon in 1987 from fashion house Yves Saint Laurent. Revlon then sold the brand on to the German company Wilde Cosmetics GmbH in 2006.

Monteil fragrances include:

 1940s:
 Laughter
 New Love
 Nostalgia
 Frou Frou

 1950s:
 Fleur Savage
 Gigolo
 Royal Secret
 Nouvel Amour
 Rigolade

 1990s:
 L'Eau de Monteil (1996)

References

American fashion designers
American women fashion designers
French fashion designers
French women fashion designers
Design companies established in 1936
Manufacturing companies established in 1936
Cosmetics companies of the United States
Companies based in New York City
History of cosmetics
Perfume houses
1898 births
1987 deaths
20th-century American women
20th-century American people
French emigrants to the United States